Straževica is an archeological site, located on top of the hill called Straževica in the Dragljevo, village , Berkovići municipality, Republika Srpska, Bosnia and Herzegovina. There are no data about this asset. It is believed that one of three sisters by the name Strazevica had built a church for the local population.

The assets is on the list of national monuments of Bosnia and Herzegovina.

References

Prehistoric Bosnia and Herzegovina
Hill forts in Bosnia and Herzegovina